

The Martin MO was an American observation monoplane built by the Glenn L. Martin Company of Cleveland, Ohio for the United States Navy.

In the early 1920s the United States Navy became interested in a thick airfoil section, cantilever wing, United States military observation aircraft, developed by the Dutch company Fokker. The Navy's Bureau of Aeronautics designed a three-seat observation monoplane to use a similar wing. Production of the aircraft, designated the MO-1, was contracted to the Glenn L. Martin Company with an order for 36 aircraft. The MO-1 was a shoulder-wing cantilever monoplane with a slab-sided fuselage and a fixed tailwheel landing gear. It had an all-metal structure with a fabric covering, and was powered by a Curtiss D-12 engine. In 1924 one aircraft was fitted with float landing gear for evaluation.

Variants
MO-1
Production version for the United States Navy, 36 built.

Operators

United States Navy

Specifications (MO-1)

References
 John Andrade, U.S.Military Aircraft Designations and Serials since 1909, Midland Counties Publications, 1979,  (Page 204)
 The Illustrated Encyclopedia of Aircraft (Part Work 1982-1985), 1985, Orbis Publishing, Page 2419

External links

1920s United States military reconnaissance aircraft
Shoulder-wing aircraft
Single-engined tractor aircraft
Aircraft first flown in 1924